Bobby Green (born September 9, 1986) is an American professional mixed martial artist. He currently competes in the Lightweight division in the Ultimate Fighting Championship (UFC). A professional competitor since 2008, Green is the former King of the Cage Lightweight Champion and Junior Welterweight Champion, and in addition he has also competed in Tachi Palace Fights, Strikeforce, and Affliction. Green also made an appearance on the MTV/MTV2 reality show Bully Beatdown.

Background
Green was born in San Bernardino, California and became a foster child when he was five years old, as his father was incarcerated and mother was unable to take care of her children due to a drug addiction. Green began wrestling in his sophomore year at A.B. Miller High School in Fontana, California, placing twice in the state tournament. Green began pursuing a career in professional mixed martial arts while he was also working at a warehouse to help support his son.

Mixed martial arts career

Early career
Green made his professional mixed martial arts debut in January 2008, and quickly amassed an 8–1 record while fighting on independent events.

Green drew the attention of Affliction Entertainment and fought on their second (and final) card Day of Reckoning. He lost to Dan Lauzon via submission in the first round. Green was docked two points in the first round, in what Sherdog has called one of the dirtiest fights in recent memory.

Following the loss, Green began a successful run in the King of the Cage promotion.  On February 25, 2010,  Green defeated Ricky Legere via first-round TKO to win the King of the Cage Junior Welterweight Championship at KOTC Arrival at the San Manuel Casino in Highland, California.  He eventually defended the title once before losing it to Tim Means. On April 21, Green defeated Dom O'Grady by unanimous decision to win the King of the Cage Lightweight Championship.

Strikeforce
On July 14, 2011, it was announced that Green had signed a four-fight deal with Strikeforce. It was originally announced that Green would debut against Milton Vieira at Strikeforce Challengers: Gurgel vs. Duarte. However, on July 19, it was announced he would be filling in for Lyle Beerbohm against Gesias Cavalcante at Strikeforce: Fedor vs. Henderson. The fight was very back and forth, but Green lost the fight via a narrow split decision.

His next bout came against Charon Spain at Strikeforce Challengers: Larkin vs. Rossborough. Green won the fight via submission (arm-triangle choke) in the second round but is out indefinitely due to left and right hand injuries.

Green was scheduled to face Isaac Vallie-Flagg at Strikeforce Challengers: Britt vs. Sayers. However, Vallie-Flagg was forced out of the bout with an injury and replaced by J. P. Reese. He won the fight via submission in the third round.

On May 19, 2012, Green faced James Terry at Strikeforce: Barnett vs. Cormier where he won via split decision (28–29, 29–28, 29–28).

Green next faced Matt Ricehouse on August 18, 2012 at Strikeforce: Rousey vs. Kaufman and won the fight via unanimous decision.

Ultimate Fighting Championship
Green defeated Jacob Volkmann on February 2, 2013 at UFC 156 via rear-naked choke submission in the third round.  After back and forth action in the first two rounds, Green displayed some great grappling, countering Volkmann's attempts and finishing with the choke after some vicious ground and pound, which forced Volkmann to give up his back. The performance earned Green Submission of the Night honors.

Green was expected to face Danny Castillo on July 27, 2013 at UFC on Fox 8.  However, in mid-July, Green pulled out of the bout citing an injury and was replaced by Tim Means.

Green faced James Krause on November 6, 2013 at UFC Fight Night 31. The fight ended in unusual fashion as Green had previously kicked Krause in the groin area twice, resulting in a one-point deduction. Green then landed a blow to Krause's belt line, which resulted in Krause falling to the canvas. Referee John McCarthy declared it a legal blow and awarded Green a TKO victory.

Green quickly stepped back into the octagon filling in for the injured Jamie Varner against Pat Healy at UFC on Fox 9. He won the fight via unanimous decision.

Green was expected to face Abel Trujillo on February 1, 2014 at UFC 169. However, Green pulled out due to undisclosed reasons and was replaced by Jamie Varner.

Green was expected to face Jim Miller on April 26, 2014 at UFC 172.  However, in the week leading up to the event, Green pulled out of the bout citing another injury and was replaced by Yancy Medeiros.

The bout with Trujillo was rescheduled for August 2, 2014 at UFC 176.  However, after UFC 176 was cancelled, Green/Trujillo was rescheduled and was expected to take place on August 16, 2014 at UFC Fight Night 47. Subsequently, Green was removed from this fight on July 11 in favor of a matchup with against Josh Thomson as Green replaced Michael Johnson on July 26, 2014 at UFC on Fox 12.  Green won the bout via split decision.

A bout with Jorge Masvidal, first scheduled under the Strikeforce banner in 2012 before being scrapped, was expected to take place on September 27, 2014 at UFC 178. However, on August 14, the UFC announced that Green would now face Donald Cerrone at the event. Following the signing and scheduling of former Bellator MMA Lightweight Champion Eddie Alvarez to face Cerrone at the event, Green was rescheduled to compete at a later, undetermined date.

Green faced Edson Barboza on November 22, 2014 at UFC Fight Night 57. Green lost the fight via unanimous decision.

Green was briefly linked to a bout with Jorge Masvidal on April 4, 2015 at UFC Fight Night 63.  However, shortly after the fight was announced by the UFC, Green pulled out of the bout citing an injury and was replaced by Benson Henderson

Green was expected to face Al Iaquinta on July 15, 2015, at UFC Fight Night 71.  However, Green pulled out of the fight in mid-June citing another injury.

Green next faced Dustin Poirier on June 4, 2016 at UFC 199. He lost the fight via knockout in the first round.

Green was expected to face Josh Burkman on October 1, 2016 at UFC Fight Night 96. However, Green pulled out of the fight on September 9 citing personal issues and was replaced by promotional newcomer Zak Ottow.

Green faced Rashid Magomedov on April 15, 2017 at UFC on Fox 24. He lost the fight by split decision.

As the last fight of his prevailing contract, Green faced Lando Vannata on October 7, 2017 at UFC 216. In round one Vannata landed an illegal knee to the head of the grounded Green, which caused referee Herb Dean to deduct Vannata a point. The judges handed down a split draw after three rounds with one judge had it even 28–28, one judge scored it 29–27 to Green, and one judge scored it 29–27 for Vannata.  This fight earned him Fight of the Night award.

Green faced Erik Koch on January 27, 2018 at UFC on Fox: Jacaré vs. Brunson 2. He won the fight via unanimous decision.

Green was expected to face Beneil Dariush on March 3, 2018 at UFC 222. However, on February 14, 2018, it was announced that Green was forced to pull out from the event, citing injury.

Green was expected to face Clay Guida on June 9, 2018 at UFC 225. However, Green was forced out of the bout due to an injury and was replaced by Charles Oliveira

Green faced Drakkar Klose on December 15 at UFC on Fox 31 He lost the fight by unanimous decision. Green announced his retirement after he lost the fight.

After his brief hiatus, Green returned to face Francisco Trinaldo on November 16, 2019 at UFC on ESPN+ 22. He lost the fight via unanimous decision.

Green faced Clay Guida on June 20, 2020 at UFC Fight Night: Blaydes vs. Volkov.  He won the fight via unanimous decision.

A rematch with Lando Vannata took place on August 1, 2020 at UFC Fight Night: Brunson vs. Shahbazyan. He won the fight via unanimous decision. This fight earned him the Fight of the Night award.

Green faced Alan Patrick, replacing Rodrigo Vargas on September 12, 2020 at UFC Fight Night 177. He won the fight via unanimous decision.

Green faced Thiago Moisés on October 31, 2020 at UFC Fight Night 181. He lost the fight via unanimous decision. However 11 out of 15 media outlets scored the bout as a win for Green.

Green was expected to face Jim Miller on February 13, 2021 at UFC 258. However the fight was cancelled when Green collapsed after the weigh-ins.

Green faced Rafael Fiziev on August 7, 2021 at UFC 265. He lost the fight via unanimous decision.  This fight earned him the Fight of the Night award.

Green faced Al Iaquinta on November 6, 2021 at UFC 268. Green won the fight by TKO in round one. This win earned him the Performance of the Night award.

Green faced Nasrat Haqparast on February 12, 2022 at UFC 271. He won the bout via unanimous decision.

Just two weeks after his last UFC bout, Green stepped up to replace an injured Beneil Dariush against Islam Makhachev on February 26, 2022 in the main event at UFC Fight Night 202. He lost the bout via ground and pound TKO in the first round.

Green was rebooked to face Jim Miller for the third time on July 2, 2022, at UFC 276. A week before the event, Green was forced to pull out of the bout.

Green received a six month USADA suspension for 6 months testing positive Dehydroepiandrosterone (DHEA) on out of competition drug test on May 16, 2022 and he is eligible to fight again on November 16, 2022.

Green faced Drew Dober on December 17, 2022, at UFC Fight Night 216.  He lost the fight via knockout in round two. This fight earned him the Fight of the Night award.

Green is scheduled to face Jared Gordon on April 22, 2023, at UFC Fight Night 222. In mid-February, Green announced that he would retire after the fight with Gordon.

Personal life
Green has three children.

Championships and accomplishments

Mixed martial arts
Ultimate Fighting Championship
Submission of the Night (One time)
 Performance of the Night (One time) 
Fight of the Night (Four times)  
 Most significant strikes in UFC Lightweight history (1477)
 Most total strikes landed in UFC Lightweight history (1695)
MMAjunkie.com
2017 October Fight of the Month 
2020 August Fight of the Month 
King of the Cage
KOTC Lightweight Championship (One time)
KOTC Junior Welterweight Championship (One time)
One successful title defense
Total Fight Alliance
TFA Lightweight Championship (One time)
Warriors Fighting Championship
WFC 2008 Lightweight Tournament Winner

Amateur wrestling
California Interscholastic Federation
CIF All-State (2003, 2004)
CIF State Championship Sportsmanship Award (2004)

Mixed martial arts record

|-
| Loss 
|align=center|29–14–1
|Drew Dober
|KO (punch)
|UFC Fight Night: Cannonier vs. Strickland
| 
|align=center|2
|align=center|2:45
|Las Vegas, Nevada, United States
|
|-
|Loss
|align=center|29–13–1
|Islam Makhachev
|TKO (punches)
|UFC Fight Night: Makhachev vs. Green
|
|align=center|1
|align=center|3:23
|Las Vegas, Nevada, United States
|
|-
|Win
|align=center|29–12–1
|Nasrat Haqparast
|Decision (unanimous)
|UFC 271
|
|align=center|3
|align=center|5:00
|Houston, Texas, United States
|
|-
|Win
|align=center|28–12–1
|Al Iaquinta
|TKO (punches)
|UFC 268
|
|align=center|1
|align=center|2:25
|New York City, New York, United States
|
|-
|Loss
|align=center|27–12–1
|Rafael Fiziev
|Decision (unanimous)
|UFC 265 
|
|align=center|3
|align=center|5:00
|Houston, Texas, United States
|
|-
|Loss
|align=center|27–11–1
|Thiago Moisés
|Decision (unanimous)
|UFC Fight Night: Hall vs. Silva
|
|align=center|3
|align=center|5:00
|Las Vegas, Nevada, United States
|
|-
|Win
|align=center|27–10–1
|Alan Patrick
|Decision (unanimous)
|UFC Fight Night: Waterson vs. Hill
|
|align=center|3
|align=center|5:00
|Las Vegas, Nevada, United States
|
|-
|Win
|align=center|26–10–1
|Lando Vannata
|Decision (unanimous)
|UFC Fight Night: Brunson vs. Shahbazyan
|
|align=center|3
|align=center|5:00
|Las Vegas, Nevada, United States
||
|-
|Win
|align=center|25–10–1
|Clay Guida
|Decision (unanimous)
|UFC on ESPN: Blaydes vs. Volkov 
|
|align=center|3
|align=center|5:00
|Las Vegas, Nevada, United States
|
|-
|Loss
|align=center|
|Francisco Trinaldo
|Decision (unanimous)
|UFC Fight Night: Błachowicz vs. Jacaré 
|
|align=center|3
|align=center|5:00
|São Paulo, Brazil
|
|-
|Loss
|align=center|24–9–1
|Drakkar Klose
|Decision (unanimous)
|UFC on Fox: Lee vs. Iaquinta 2
|
|align=center|3
|align=center|5:00
|Milwaukee, Wisconsin, United States
|
|-
|Win
|align=center|24–8–1
|Erik Koch
|Decision (unanimous)
|UFC on Fox: Jacaré vs. Brunson 2 
|
|align=center|3
|align=center|5:00
|Charlotte, North Carolina, United States
|
|-
|Draw
|align=center|23–8–1
|Lando Vannata
|Draw (split)
|UFC 216 
|
|align=center|3
|align=center|5:00
|Las Vegas, Nevada, United States
|
|-
|Loss
|align=center|23–8
|Rashid Magomedov
|Decision (split)
|UFC on Fox: Johnson vs. Reis
|
|align=center|3
|align=center|5:00
|Kansas City, Missouri, United States
|
|-
|Loss
|align=center|23–7
|Dustin Poirier
|KO (punches)
|UFC 199
|
|align=center|1
|align=center|2:53
|Inglewood, California, United States
| 
|-
| Loss
| align=center| 23–6
| Edson Barboza
| Decision (unanimous)
| UFC Fight Night: Edgar vs. Swanson
| 
| align=center| 3
| align=center| 5:00
| Austin, Texas, United States
| 
|-
| Win
| align=center| 23–5
| Josh Thomson
| Decision (split)
| UFC on Fox: Lawler vs. Brown
| 
| align=center| 3
| align=center| 5:00
| San Jose, California, United States
| 
|-
| Win
| align=center| 22–5
| Pat Healy
| Decision (unanimous)
| UFC on Fox: Johnson vs. Benavidez 2
| 
| align=center| 3
| align=center| 5:00
| Sacramento, California, United States
| 
|-
| Win 
| align=center| 21–5
| James Krause
| TKO (body kick)
| UFC: Fight for the Troops 3
| 
| align=center| 1
| align=center| 3:50
| Fort Campbell, Kentucky, United States
| 
|-
| Win
| align=center| 20–5
| Jacob Volkmann
| Submission (rear-naked choke) 
| UFC 156
| 
| align=center| 3
| align=center| 4:25
| Las Vegas, Nevada, United States
| 
|-
| Win
| align=center| 19–5
| Matt Ricehouse
| Decision (unanimous)
| Strikeforce: Rousey vs. Kaufman
| 
| align=center| 3
| align=center| 5:00
| San Diego, California, United States
| 
|-
| Win
| align=center| 18–5
| James Terry
| Decision (split)
| Strikeforce: Barnett vs. Cormier
| 
| align=center| 3
| align=center| 5:00 
| San Jose, California, United States
| 
|-
| Win
| align=center| 17–5
| J. P. Reese
| Submission (rear-naked choke)
| Strikeforce Challengers: Britt vs. Sayers
| 
| align=center| 3
| align=center| 2:25 
| Las Vegas, Nevada, United States
| 
|-
| Win
| align=center| 16–5
| Charon Spain
| Submission (arm-triangle choke)
| Strikeforce Challengers: Larkin vs. Rossborough
| 
| align=center| 2
| align=center| 2:54 
| Las Vegas, Nevada, United States
| 
|-
| Loss
| align=center| 15–5
| Gesias Cavalcante
| Decision (split)
| Strikeforce: Fedor vs. Henderson
| 
| align=center| 3
| align=center| 5:00
| Hoffman Estates, Illinois, United States
| 
|-
| Win
| align=center| 15–4
| Dom O'Grady
| Decision (unanimous)
| KOTC: Moral Victory
| 
| align=center| 5
| align=center| 5:00
| Highland, California, United States
| 
|-
| Loss
| align=center| 14–4
| Tim Means
| TKO (retirement)
| KOTC: Inferno
| 
| align=center| 2
| align=center| 5:00
| Highland, California, United States
| 
|-
| Win
| align=center| 14–3
| Daron Cruickshank
| Submission (guillotine choke)
| KOTC: Imminent Danger
| 
| align=center| 2
| align=center| 2:39
| Mescalero, New Mexico, United States
| 
|-
| Win
| align=center| 13–3
| Ricky Legere
| TKO (punches)
| KOTC: Arrival
| 
| align=center| 1
| align=center| 4:27
| Highland, California, United States
| 
|-
| Win
| align=center| 12–3
| Charles Bennett
| KO (punches)
| KOTC: Fight 4 Hope
| 
| align=center| 1
| align=center| 2:17
| Highland, California, United States
| 
|-
| Loss
| align=center| 11–3
| David Mitchell
| Submission (toe hold)
| TPF 2: Brawl in the Hall
| 
| align=center| 1
| align=center| 0:54
| Lemoore, California, United States
| 
|-
| Win
| align=center| 11–2
| Sevak Magakian
| TKO (punches)
| Respect in the Cage 2
| 
| align=center| 1
| align=center| 2:24
| Pomona, California, United States
| 
|-
| Win
| align=center| 10–2
| Jeff Torch
| TKO (submission to punches)
| KOTC: Jolted
| 
| align=center| 1
| align=center| 1:29
| Laughlin, Nevada, United States
| 
|-
| Win
| align=center| 9–2
| John Ulloa
| Submission (armbar)
| KOTC: Immortal
| 
| align=center| 1
| align=center| N/A
| San Bernardino, California, United States
| 
|-
| Loss
| align=center| 8–2
| Dan Lauzon
| Submission (rear-naked choke)
| Affliction: Day of Reckoning
| 
| align=center| 1
| align=center| 4:55
| Anaheim, California, United States
| 
|-
| Win
| align=center| 8–1
| Toby Grear
| TKO (punches)
| TFA 11: Pounding at the Pyramid
| 
| align=center| 2
| align=center| 3:25
| Long Beach, California, United States
|  
|-
| Win
| align=center| 7–1
| Rafael Salomao
| TKO (punches)
| rowspan=3|Warriors Fighting Championship
| rowspan=3|
| align=center| 1
| align=center| 4:10
| rowspan=3|Mexico City, Mexico
|  
|-
| Win
| align=center| 6–1
| Israel Giron
| KO (punches)
| align=center| 1
| align=center| 2:47
|  
|-
| Win
| align=center| 5–1
| Santiago Manzanares
| Decision (split)
| align=center| 3
| align=center| 3:00
|  
|-
| Win
| align=center| 4–1
| Raymond Ayala
| Submission (choke)
| Total Fighting Alliance 10
| 
| align=center| 2
| align=center| 1:59
| Santa Monica, California, United States
|
|-
| Win
| align=center| 3–1
| Herman Terrado
| Submission (guillotine choke)
| COF 11: No Mercy
| 
| align=center| 3
| align=center| 1:28
| Tijuana, Mexico
|
|-
| Loss
| align=center| 2–1
| Josh Gaskins
| Decision (unanimous)
| Valor Fighting: Fight Night
| 
| align=center| 3
| align=center| 3:00
| Tustin, California, United States
| 
|-
| Win
| align=center| 2–0
| Henry Briones
| Submission (guillotine choke)
| UCM 5 - Deadly Zone
| 
| align=center| 1
| align=center| 0:48
| Tijuana, Mexico
| 
|-
| Win
| align=center| 1–0
| Neal Abrams
| KO (punches)
| Total Fighting Alliance 9
| 
| align=center| 3
| align=center| 1:12
| Santa Monica, California, United States
|

See also
 List of current UFC fighters
 List of male mixed martial artists

References

Notes

External links
 
 

1986 births
Living people
African-American mixed martial artists
American male mixed martial artists
Mixed martial artists from California
Mixed martial artists utilizing wrestling
Mixed martial artists utilizing Brazilian jiu-jitsu
American practitioners of Brazilian jiu-jitsu
People from Fontana, California
Sportspeople from San Bernardino, California
Ultimate Fighting Championship male fighters
American male sport wrestlers
Amateur wrestlers
21st-century African-American sportspeople
20th-century African-American people